The 2011–12 season was the 108th season in Real Madrid Club de Fútbol's history and their 81st consecutive season in La Liga, the top division of Spanish football. It covered a period from 1 July 2011 to 30 June 2012.

Real Madrid began the season finishing runners-up in the Supercopa de España to Barcelona, losing 5–4 on aggregate. The team then went on to produce a magnificent season, winning a record 32nd La Liga title and setting a number of league records, including 100 points amassed in a single season, a total of 121 goals scored, a goal difference of +89, 16 away games won, and 32 wins overall. They also competed in the UEFA Champions League for the 15th successive season, losing in the semi-finals to Bayern Munich on penalties (after a 3–3 aggregate tie) in heartbreaking fashion. Madrid entered the Copa del Rey as the defending champions, but lost 3–4 on aggregate in the quarter-finals to Barcelona. In the same season, Cristiano Ronaldo became the fastest player to reach 100 goals scored in Spanish league history. In reaching 101 goals in 92 games, Ronaldo surpassed Real Madrid legend Ferenc Puskás, who scored 100 goals in 105 matches. Ronaldo set a new club mark for individual goals scored in one year (60) and became the first player ever to score against all 19 opposition teams in a single season.

The season has been often termed by some newspapers as "La Liga de los Récords" (Spanish for "The League of the Records") as Real Madrid broke several long-standing La Liga records, the most prominent being the highest number of points in a single La Liga season. Their total of 100 was one point better than the previous record set by Barcelona in the 2009–10 season. Real Madrid also recorded the most goals in a league season with 121, surpassing the previous record held by the Real Madrid side that scored 107 goals during the 1989–90 season.

Season overview

Pre-season
Real Madrid commenced their summer transfer activity on 9 May, signing Turkish central midfielder Nuri Şahin for six seasons from Borussia Dortmund on a transfer reported to be worth €10 million. Versatile Turkish midfielder Hamit Altıntop was signed for four seasons on a free transfer from Bayern Munich on 19 May, but was discovered to have a prolapsed disc on 23 June, undergoing a successful operation four days later. The club announced on 21 May that veteran Polish goalkeeper Jerzy Dudek's contract would not be renewed; he subsequently retired. Former Castilla winger José Callejón was brought back after three seasons at Espanyol for a reported fee of €5 million on 23 May.

Real Madrid fired Director General Jorge Valdano on 25 May after a strained relationship over sporting decisions between him and manager José Mourinho. President Florentino Pérez supported Mourinho's request to "be able to manage the team with autonomy" in response to tensions during the previous season's winter transfer window and a public feud regarding Karim Benzema following a 1–1 draw against Almería. Valdano was reported to be paid €3.5 million to release him from the remaining two years on his contract and was replaced by José Ángel Sánchez. Mourinho subsequently became head of football operations in addition to his role as head coach with former player and special adviser to Pérez Zinedine Zidane as the new director of football for the first team.

Real Madrid continued their transfer activity on 27 June, signing teenage French central defender Raphaël Varane from Lens for six seasons on a reported €10 million transfer. On 1 July, Royston Drenthe and David Mateos returned from their loan spells at Hércules and AEK Athens, respectively, while Emmanuel Adebayor returned to Manchester City following a six-month loan. Mateos was loaned out ten days later to Real Zaragoza with Zaragoza having an option to purchase the player permanently at the end of the season, and Drenthe was loaned to Everton late on the final day of the transfer window. Portuguese wingback Fábio Coentrão transferred from Benfica for €30 million on 5 July and signed a six-year contract.

Real Madrid traveled to the UCLA campus in Los Angeles, California, on 11 July to prepare for friendlies against the LA Galaxy, Guadalajara and Philadelphia Union in the World Football Challenge. Castilla players Jesús Fernández, Tomás Mejías, Jorge Casado, Nacho, Jesé and Joselu accompanied the first team to the United States. On 12 July, the contracts of Pepe and Sergio Ramos were extended to 2016 and 2017, respectively, and Nuri Şahin suffered a Grade I sprain on the internal lateral ligament in his left knee during the first day of training, causing him to miss the entire pre-season. On 17 July, defender Ezequiel Garay transferred to Benfica for an undisclosed fee. Real Madrid's pre-season began with a 4–1 victory over Major League Soccer (MLS) team LA Galaxy, with goals from Callejón, Joselu, Cristiano Ronaldo and Benzema. Four days later in San Diego against Mexican Primera División side Guadalajara, Ronaldo scored a second half hat-trick over a nine-minute span for a 3–0 victory. Real Madrid completed the World Football Challenge atop the table following a 2–1 win over Philadelphia Union, with early goals from Callejón and Mesut Özil. They officially won the tournament via goal differential when Manchester United defeated Barcelona 2–1 on 30 July. Ronaldo finished as the tournament's top scorer with four goals.

Real Madrid started the European leg of their pre-season world tour with a triumph over newly promoted Bundesliga team Hertha BSC on 27 July in front of a sold out Olympiastadion. Patrick Ebert opened the scoring for Hertha, but Ronaldo equalized from a long-range free kick and Benzema added two goals for a 3–1 victory. Three days later Real Madrid defeated Championship side Leicester City 2–1 to win the npower Challenge Cup. Callejón scored the opening goal and Benzema converted a rebound following a shot off the goalpost by Marcelo before Lloyd Dyer added a late consolation goal.

José Mourinho's five-game touchline ban in the UEFA Champions League due to accusatory statements following the first leg of the previous season's Champions League semi-final was partially upheld following an appeal to UEFA on 29 July. He was originally suspended for five matches, with the final game suspended for a probational period of three years, and fined €50,000 for accusing Barcelona of receiving favorable treatment from UEFA and for severely criticizing German referee Wolfgang Stark. After serving the first game of his suspension in the second leg, Mourinho had the remaining four matches of his ban reduced to a two-game suspension with a potential two further games over a three-year probationary period. The original fine to Mourinho was upheld along with a €20,000 fine assessed to Real Madrid for crowd trouble.

The club traveled to Guangzhou, China, directly from Leicester on 1 August, and signed a letter of intent the following day with Guangzhou Evergrande involving club cooperation, potential player exchanges, and the opening of the largest football academy in China. On 3 August, Real Madrid defeated Chinese Super League leaders Guangzhou Evergrande 7–1, with goals from Sami Khedira, Özil, Benzema twice, Ronaldo, Jesé, and Ángel Di María. The following day, attacking midfielder Sergio Canales joined Valencia on loan for two seasons with Valencia retaining a purchase option of €12 million at the end of each season. Real Madrid concluded their pre-season world tour with all victories on 6 August, defeating Tianjin Teda 6–0 with goals from Kaká, Di María, Gonzalo Higuaín, Ronaldo and a double by Benzema.

August
Real Madrid opened their competitive season with a 2–2 draw at home in the first leg of the 2011 Supercopa de España against Barcelona on 14 August. Özil scored after 13 minutes following an assist from Benzema, but goals from David Villa and Lionel Messi against the run of play gave Barcelona the lead at halftime. Xabi Alonso shot through traffic during a corner sequence for the equalizer nine minutes into the second half. Three days later in the return leg at Camp Nou, Barcelona defeated Real Madrid 3–2 to win 5–4 on aggregate. Andrés Iniesta beat the offside trap and scored first for Barcelona, but Ronaldo redirected a cross to equalize five minutes later. Messi scored just before halftime following a failed clearance of a corner kick by Real Madrid and a subsequent backheel assist from Gerard Piqué to give Barcelona a 2–1 lead at halftime. Benzema leveled the score late in the second half following a scramble from a corner kick, but an Adriano cross allowed Messi to score the winning goal in the 88th minute. Marcelo received a straight red card in stoppage time for a tackle on Cesc Fàbregas, creating an ensuing scuffle between the two sides that led to Mourinho confronting Barcelona assistant coach Tito Vilanova with a poke in the eye and expulsions of Villa and Özil. Six days later, the Royal Spanish Football Federation opened disciplinary investigations against both Mourinho and Vilanova that could have potentially resulted in a 12-game suspension for Mourinho but instead suspended him for two future Supercopa de España matches and fined €600. Real Madrid was additionally fined €180.

Real Madrid's La Liga campaign was scheduled to begin on 21 August at home against Athletic Bilbao, but the Spanish Footballers' Association, with representation from all 42 teams in the top two divisions, unanimously elected to strike after failing to reach a collective bargaining agreement with the Liga de Fútbol Profesional, causing the postponement of the first weekend of fixtures. The team won their seventh consecutive Santiago Bernabéu Trophy, defeating Turkish Süper Lig side Galatasaray on 24 August. Before the match, Real Madrid officially presented their five new summer signings and honored their three youth team players on the Spanish under-19 squad that won the 2011 UEFA European Under-19 Football Championship. Selçuk İnan scored early for Galatasaray from close range, but a pair of assists from man of the match Xabi Alonso to Sergio Ramos and Benzema led Real Madrid to a 2–1 victory in the annual friendly. Real Madrid's La Liga season began with a 0–6 win at Real Zaragoza on 28 August, with goals from Marcelo, Alonso, Kaká and a hat-trick by Ronaldo, including his 100th goal as a Real Madrid player. The win was the most lopsided away victory on opening day in Spanish top flight history.

On 31 August, the final day of the summer transfer window, Real Madrid loaned out midfielders Pedro León, Fernando Gago and Royston Drenthe. Pedro León joined Getafe, the team he was purchased from a year ago, and Gago joined Roma, with both Getafe and Roma retaining the option to acquire their respective player for €6 million at the end of the season. Drenthe joined Everton for a season-long loan in a deal that was finalized late on deadline day.

September

Real Madrid's first La Liga home match resulted in a 4–2 victory over local rivals Getafe on 10 September. Benzema scored his first two goals in La Liga while Ronaldo converted a penalty and Higuaín added a late goal. The victory boosted Real Madrid to a two-point advantage over Barcelona, as Barcelona drew 2–2 earlier in the day at Real Sociedad. Four days later, Real Madrid defeated Dinamo Zagreb 1–0 in on Matchday 1 of the UEFA Champions League despite Mourinho serving his second of three touchline bans in the competition and a second yellow card to Marcelo for diving in the penalty area. Di María scored the lone goal early in the second half, while Ronaldo received stitches to his right ankle after the match. The injury forced Ronaldo out of the starting lineup against Levante on 18 September, a match Real Madrid lost 1–0 on a second half counterattack goal from Arouna Koné. Real Madrid played with a man down when Khedira received his second yellow card in the 40th minute for defending Di María from Sergio Ballesteros during a fracas; Mourinho later commented Khedira "fell for the trap." Three days later Real Madrid again failed to score, drawing 0–0 at Racing Santander in a match in which Varane made his official debut. On 24 September, the team defeated Rayo Vallecano 6–2 at home. Michu scored for the visitors 17 seconds into the match following an intercepted backpass from Lassana Diarra, but goals from Ronaldo and Higuaín lifted Real Madrid to a 2–1 halftime lead. Ronaldo and Michu scored again early in the second half shortly before a second yellow card to Di María for an intentional handball. Despite the numerical disadvantage, Ronaldo completed his hat-trick and Varane and Benzema added goals in the victory. Varane, at 18 years and 152 days, became the youngest foreign player to score in a competitive match for Real Madrid. Hamit Altıntop made his official debut in a 3–0 victory over Ajax on Matchday 2 of the Champions League on 27 September. Ronaldo, Kaká, and Benzema each scored a goal and provided an assist.

October
Real Madrid defeated Espanyol away 0–4 on 2 October. Higuaín scored a hat-trick and Callejón scored his first official goal for Real Madrid. Higuaín added another hat-trick, his third in two weeks including one for Argentina, and Kaká scored a goal on 15 October in a 4–1 victory over Real Betis. Despite his recent goalscoring form, Higuaín was dropped from the starting lineup in favor of Benzema for the Champions League match against Olympique Lyonnais three days later. Mourinho returned from suspension and guided Real Madrid to a 4–0 victory, inflicting Lyon with their largest ever defeat in the Champions League. Benzema finished Ronaldo's flick from an Özil corner and then assisted Khedira for his first competitive goal at Real Madrid. Lyon goalkeeper Hugo Lloris redirected a cross by Özil for an own goal, and Sergio Ramos completed the scoring from a Kaká corner. The win lifted Real Madrid five points clear atop Group D.

Real Madrid defeated Málaga away on 22 October and moved one point ahead of Barcelona after they were held to a scoreless draw by Sevilla. Higuaín opened the scoring and Ronaldo scored his third hat-trick in La Liga this season for a 0–4 win. This was the first time in club history Real Madrid scored at least four goals in four successive La Liga matches. Four days later Real Madrid blanked Villarreal 3–0 at home with three first half goals. Di María assisted early goals by Benzema and Kaká and then scored one himself on a counterattack. Real Madrid completed the month of October with all victories after defeating Real Sociedad away 0–1 on 29 October with an early goal from Higuaín. The clean sheet also equaled a club record of four consecutive away games in La Liga without conceding a goal. They reclaimed the La Liga lead after Levante lost the following day. IFFHS recognized Real Madrid as The World's Club Team of the Month for October.

November
Real Madrid clinched a spot in the Champions League knockout phase on 2 November when they defeated Lyon away 0–2. Ronaldo scored both goals to reach 100 competitive goals for Real Madrid in 105 matches. He beat Lloris with a powerful free kick in the first half, which was Real Madrid's 900th goal in European competition, and a penalty kick in the second half. Four days later, Real Madrid defeated Osasuna 7–1 in their first ever noon kickoff, scheduled to cater to Asian audiences. Sixty million people watched the match from China as a result. Prior to kickoff, Ronaldo presented his 2010–11 European Golden Shoe award and the team supported former player Antonio Cassano, who recently suffered a stroke and underwent heart surgery, by wearing "Forza Cassano" shirts. Ronaldo scored his fourth hat-trick in La Liga, Benzema netted two goals, and Pepe and Higuaín scored one each in the victory. Di María served three assists in the first half before tearing his hamstring early in the second half, and Şahin made his Real Madrid debut as a substitute following six months of injury. Real Madrid defeated Valencia away 2–3 on 19 November for their 11th consecutive victory, the longest in Mourinho's managerial career. Nicolás Terol, champion of the 2011 Grand Prix motorcycle racing season 125cc class, ceremonially kicked off the match. Benzema opened the scoring in the first half from a quickly taken Alonso free kick, and Sergio Ramos doubled the lead from a corner in the second half. Roberto Soldado pulled a goal back for Valencia before Ronaldo avoided onrushing goalkeeper Diego Alves to restore a two-goal advantage. Soldado scored again four minutes later, but Valencia had an appeal for a handball in the penalty area turned down in stoppage time. Three days later Real Madrid defeated Dinamo Zagreb 6–2 in their 1,500th official match at the Santiago Bernabéu to clinch top spot in their Champions League group. Despite resting Ronaldo, Iker Casillas and Pepe, Real Madrid scored four goals in the opening 20 minutes through Benzema, Callejón, Özil and Higuaín. Callejón and Benzema scored again after halftime before Fatos Bećiraj and Ivan Tomečak added late consolation goals. The win was also their 250th in UEFA competitions. On 26 November, Real Madrid stretched their unbeaten streak against Atlético Madrid to 22 matches after a 4–1 home victory in the Madrid Derby. Prior to kickoff, Casillas was presented with a commemorative ball by Florentino Pérez for recently becoming the most capped Spanish international of all time. Atlético struck first through Adrián, but shortly afterward goalkeeper Thibaut Courtois was sent off while conceding a penalty, converted by Ronaldo. Di María finished a low cross from Ronaldo early in the second half, and then Higuaín extended the lead by capitalizing on a defensive error from Diego Godín. Godín was later sent off for denying Higuaín a clear goalscoring opportunity in the box and Ronaldo converted another penalty. The victory coupled with Barcelona's loss at Gefate boosted Real Madrid's lead in La Liga to six points. Real Madrid were again recognized by IFFHS as The World's Club Team of the Month after completing November with all victories.

December
Real Madrid started the month of December with a 0–3 away victory against Sporting de Gijón on 3 December, their 14th consecutive win. Fitness coach Rui Faria was sent off early in the match for protesting a refereeing decision and was subsequently suspended for two matches and fined €600. Di María opened the scoring from a tight angle and then assisted Ronaldo for his 17th La Liga goal before Marcelo completed the scoring in stoppage time. Four days later, they defeated Ajax with a weakened lineup and concluded the Champions League group stage with a maximum 18 points, becoming the fifth team in Champions League history to accomplish the feat. Callejón scored two goals and Higuaín added one for a 3–0 win, although Ajax had two goals questionably disallowed for offside. Castilla loanee Pedro Mendes made his first team debut in the second half. The victory was the team's 15th consecutive win to equal a club record set in 1961. On 10 December, Real Madrid were defeated at home by Barcelona. Benzema scored 21 seconds after kickoff, the fastest goal in El Clásico history, following a Víctor Valdés giveaway, but an Alexis Sánchez strike, a deflected goal by Xavi, and a Cesc Fàbregas header condemned Real Madrid to a 1–3 defeat. Three days later, Real Madrid began their defense of the Copa del Rey with a 0–2 victory at Segunda División B side Ponferradina in the first leg of the round of 32. Callejón and Ronaldo scored the goals and youth team player Jesé officially debuted, but Raúl Albiol was sent off for committing two bookable offences. Real Madrid finished the calendar year as La Liga leaders by three points after a 2–6 away win against Sevilla on 17 December. Ronaldo opened the scoring in the tenth minute from a through ball by Di María. Two minutes later, Casillas made a diving save on a close-range shot from Manu. Di María then assisted Callejón for the second before Ronaldo blasted a long shot into the upper corner, but Pepe earned a second yellow card and was sent off shortly before halftime. Di María scored in the second half and dedicated the goal to his late father-in-law. Jesús Navas pulled a goal back for Sevilla, but soon afterward Manu was shown a straight red card. Ronaldo completed his hat-trick from the penalty spot and substitute Altıntop scored his first goal for Real Madrid before Álvaro Negredo added a consolation goal in stoppage time. Real Madrid defeated Ponferradina 5–1 in the return leg of the Copa del Rey on 20 December to advance 7–1 on aggregate. Callejón scored twice, Şahin scored his first goal for Real Madrid, and Varane and Castilla member Joselu each scored once, while Acorán scored the lone goal for Ponferradina. His goal ended Real Madrid's Copa del Rey clean sheet streak at a club record of 616 minutes that began during the previous season. Youth team members Jorge Casado and Fernando Pacheco made their official debuts in the match.

January
Real Madrid rallied to defeat Málaga at home 3–2 in the first leg of the round of 16 in the Copa del Rey on 3 January. Defenders Sergio Sánchez and Martín Demichelis converted headers from corners to give Málaga a 2–0 lead, prompting Mourinho to bring on Mesut Özil, Sami Khedira and Karim Benzema at half-time. Madrid then scored three goals through Khedira, Gonzalo Higuaín and Benzema over a ten-minute period for the victory. Rui Faria was again dismissed for protesting a refereeing decision. On 7 January, Real Madrid won their first La Liga game of the year 5–1 against Granada at home. Prior to kickoff, Iker Casillas received an award from medical supplier Sanitas for being the healthiest squad member during the past year as voted by fans. Benzema opened the scoring following an Özil backheel pass, one of his three assists in the match, but Granada equalized three minutes later through Mikel Rico. Sergio Ramos, Higuaín, Benzema and Cristiano Ronaldo added further goals in the victory. Real Madrid extended their La Liga lead to five points after Barcelona drew against Espanyol the following day. On 10 January, Real Madrid defeated Málaga 0–1 in the second leg of the Copa del Rey and progressed to the quarter-finals 4–2 on aggregate. An error by Málaga keeper Willy Caballero allowed Benzema to score the winning goal in the 72nd minute. Álvaro Arbeloa made his 100th appearance for Real Madrid but was sent off late in the match. Real Madrid staged another comeback win on 14 January, defeating Mallorca away 1–2. Tomer Hemed scored with a header in the 39th minute for Mallorca before Higuaín and José Callejón scored second half goals to give Madrid the win. Real Madrid lost to Barcelona at home in the first leg of the Copa del Rey quarter-finals on 18 January. Ronaldo scored early, but second half goals from defenders Carles Puyol and Eric Abidal resulted in a 1–2 defeat. On 22 January, Real Madrid ended the first half of the season as league leaders with a five-point advantage after beating Athletic Bilbao at home 4–1. Fernando Llorente scored early for the visitors but Real Madrid eventually raced to clear 4–1 victory with two penalties from Ronaldo and goals from Marcelo and Callejón. On 25 January, Madrid was eliminated from Copa del Rey by Barcelona after a 2–2 draw at Camp Nou; Barcelona qualified 4–3 on aggregate. The home side was leading after the first half 2–0 with the goals from Pedro and Dani Alves, despite Real Madrid being the dominating side. In the second half, Real Madrid leveled Barcelona with the goals from Ronaldo and Benzema. On 28 January, Real Madrid extended their lead in La Liga to seven points after beating Real Zaragoza home 3–1 while Barcelona could only conjure up a goalless draw away to Villarreal. Zaragoza took the lead in the 11th minute when Ángel Lafita scored for the visitors. Real Madrid, however, once again came from behind to finish with a comfortable win with goals from Kaká, Ronaldo and Özil.

February
On 4 February, Real Madrid started the month with a 0–1 away win over Getafe. The lone goal, a header, was scored by Sergio Ramos in the first half. On 12 February, Madrid extended their lead in La Liga to ten points after winning 4–2 at home to Levante, while Barcelona had lost the day before to Osasuna in Pamplona. Levante opened the scoring with a header from Gustavo Cabral. The turning point came after a red card to Vicente Iborra, giving away a penalty which was scored by Cristiano Ronaldo. Ronaldo then added two more goals, including a sumptuous third, before Levante pulled another back through Arouna Koné. Karim Benzema then curled home a fourth for Real to finish the scoring. On 18 February, Real Madrid continued their good form in La Liga by beating Racing de Santander at the Bernabéu 4–0. Benzema netted a brace and Ronaldo and Ángel Di María each scored one goal in the comfortable win. Racing played over half of the game with only ten men after Domingo Cisma received a second yellow card for his second handball of the game and was sent off. On 21 February, Real Madrid drew 1–1 with CSKA Moscow in the away leg of their Champions League round of 16 tie. The game, played in snowy conditions in Moscow, was led by Madrid for the majority of the match with a goal from Ronaldo, but a last-minute equalizer by Pontus Wernbloom denied the victory for the visitors. On 26 February, Real Madrid defeated city rival Rayo Vallecano at the Campo de Fútbol de Vallecas by a score of 0–1. The only goal of the game, a back-heel effort by Cristiano Ronaldo, was eventually enough for the visitors to go home with the three points in their pocket.

March
On 4 March, Real Madrid extended their streak of wins in La Liga to ten games by beating Espanyol at home 5–0. Cristiano Ronaldo, Sami Khedira and Kaká all scored in the impressive win, as did Gonzalo Higuaín, who scored twice. On 10 March, Real Madrid became the first team in the history of La Liga to win ten consecutive away games after beating Real Betis 2–3 at the Estadio Benito Villamarín. The home team started well after Jorge Molina scored early, but Higuaín equalized just over ten minutes later. In the second half, Madrid took the lead with a Ronaldo goal, but Betis equalized only a few minutes later with a strike from Jefferson Montero. Ronaldo, however, scored his second of the night later on which turned out to be the winning goal and guaranteed the full three points for the whites. Real Madrid qualified for the quarter-finals of the Champions League on 14 March by beating CSKA Moscow at home by a score of 4–1, progressing 5–2 on aggregate. Ronaldo netted a brace while Higuaín and Karim Benzema both scored one in the victory, while the lone goal from CSKA was scored by Zoran Tošić. On 18 March, Real Madrid tied against Málaga at the Bernabéu 1–1 after an injury time free kick by Santi Cazorla. Real Madrid's only goal was scored by Benzema. On 21 March, Real Madrid drew again 1–1, this time against Villarreal on the road, with Ronaldo and Marcos Senna scoring the goals. After back-to-back draws, Real Madrid was on an advantage of just six points ahead of rivals Barcelona. In the controversial game, Mourinho was expelled from the match as was fitness trainer Rui Faria for the third time in his season. The referee gave Sergio Ramos a second yellow card for a tough challenge on Nilmar and gave direct red to Özil for sarcastically applauding his decision. Pepe was also booked after the game for insulting the referee, which led to a two-game suspension for him. On 24 March, Real Madrid beat Real Sociedad 5–1, with two goals each from Ronaldo and Benzema and a single goal for Higuaín. Ronaldo averaged 1.01 goals per game by having 100 goals scored in La Liga that day. On the following week, on 27 March, Real Madrid continued their good form in the Champions League quarter-finals first leg by defeating opponent APOEL in Cyprus 0–3. Benzema scored a header from a pass from Kaká, who then scored the second one; Benzema closed the game by scoring the third goal from an Özil assist. On the last day of the month, Real Madrid beat Osasuna away, 1–5. Benzema scored a stupendous volley goal and Ronaldo equally great 36-yard long range shot at goal. It was overall Ronaldo's night, since he also scored another goal, a free kick that was deflected, and assisted two other goals. Higuaín was the third player who got his name on the scoresheet, scoring twice. His last goal was the 100th goal for Madrid in La Liga this season.

April

The month started with a 5–2 victory over APOEL in the second leg of the Champions League quarter-finals on 4 April, giving an aggregate score 8–2 as Los Blancos advanced to the semi-finals against final hosts Bayern Munich. Real Madrid was resting some of their usual starters, but still managed to score five goals overall. Cristiano Ronaldo netted a brace and Kaká, José Callejón and Ángel Di María each scored one in the victory, while APOEL's goals were scored by Gustavo Manduca and Esteban Solari, the latter scoring a penalty given to the Cypriots after Hamit Altıntop's foul in the penalty area. On 8 April, Real Madrid had a goalless draw against Valencia in La Liga, leaving them only four points ahead of Barcelona. Three days later, on 11 April, Real Madrid beat Atlético Madrid in an away game 1–4. Cristiano Ronaldo scored a hat-trick, including two astonishing goals, and assisted Callejón to score the fourth goal to close the game. Atlético's only goal was netted by Radamel Falcao. On 14 April, Real Madrid beat Sporting de Gijón home 3–1 with goals from Higuaín, Ronaldo and Benzema. Sporting's only goal was a penalty given to them after a handball from Sergio Ramos in the box, which was scored by Miguel de las Cuevas. On 17 April, Real Madrid lost to Bayern Munich away at the Allianz Arena 2–1 in the first leg of the Champions League semi-finals. Franck Ribéry and Mario Gómez scored for Bayern (the latter in the closing moments of the game), while Mesut Özil netted Madrid's lone goal. On 21 April, Real Madrid defeated Barcelona in El Clásico at Camp Nou 1–2, extending their lead in La Liga to seven points with only four matches left, which all but decided the league title. Sami Khedira opened the scoring from a corner kick in the 17th minute which broke the world record for the most goals scored in a single domestic league season, with 107. Alexis Sánchez equalized in the second half in the 70th minute, but only a few minutes later, Özil assisted and Ronaldo scored the winning goal of the game by shooting the ball over Víctor Valdés into the net. Madrid completely outplayed Barça's "unbeatable" dream team, neutralizing their tiki-taka style, and put out a statement victory which was widely viewed as a sign of changes in the existing football hierarchy, with Los Blancos overtaking Barcelona as a pre-eminent power both in Spain and Europe. On 25 April, in the second leg of the Champions League semi-finals against Bayern Munich, Cristiano Ronaldo initially put Madrid up 2–0, but former Madrid player Arjen Robben netted an away goal back for Bayern with a penalty. The match ended 2–1 after extra time and as both sides were tied 3–3, it went to a shootout. During penalties, Iker Casillas made two saves but Ronaldo, Kaká and Ramos failed to convert their spot kicks and Madrid lost 3–1, bowing out of the Champions League in a heartbreaking fashion. The Champions League setback did not break Madrid's spirit, however, as the team went on to crush Sevilla 3–0 just four days after the UCL semi-finals heartbreak. Ronaldo opened the scoring and Benzema then added a brace.

May

On 2 May 2012, Los Blancos defeated Athletic Bilbao 3–0 in an away game to be crowned champions of Spain after a four-year wait. Higuaín, Özil, and Ronaldo scored as Madrid won La Liga with two games to spare. That wasn't it however, as the team clearly targeted to achieve a record 100 points in a season. Madrid went on to beat Granada away three days later in a dramatic game that saw the home team score early, with Ronaldo equalizing on the 81th minute through a penalty, and Real clinching the victory in injury time, courtesy of an own goal. Two Granada players were sent off after the final whistle after a brawl involving the teams. The final game of the season was against Mallorca at the Bernabéu. Prior to that game, Madridistas had 97 points, meaning that they had to win to become the Centurions. Real did just that by triumphing 4–1 with goals coming from Ronaldo, Benzema, and Özil (2). The team reached the 100-point mark and set numerous records in the process. Overall, La Liga title was a sufficient consolation for a heartbreak in the Champions League semi-finals against Bayern and earlier defeats to Barça in the Supercopa and Copa del Rey.

Club

Coaching staff

Other personnel

Grounds

Kits

|
|
|
|
|

Official sponsors
bwin
• Adidas
• Mahou
• Audi
• Emirates
• Coca-Cola
• STC
• Movistar
• Sanitas
• Solán de Cabras
• Solaria
• Dua Kelinci
Source: English, Spanish, Japanese

Players

Squad information

In

Total expenditure:  €55 million

Out

Total income:  €9 million

Pre-season and friendlies

Last updated: 16 May 2012
Source: World Football Challenge, US, Europe & China Tour, Hertha Berlin, Leicester City, China Tour, Trofeo Santiago Bernabéu, Kuwait

Competitions

Supercopa de España
 

Last updated: 17 August 2011Source: RealMadrid.com

La Liga

League table

Results by round

Matches

Results overview

Last updated: 13 May 2012Source: RealMadrid.com, LFP

Copa del Rey

Round of 32

Round of 16

Quarter-finals

Last updated: 25 January 2012
Source: RFEF

UEFA Champions League

Group stage

Knockout phase

Round of 16

Quarter-finals

Semi-finals

Last updated: 25 April 2012
Source: Matches

Statistics

Squad statistics

Goals

Last updated: 13 May 2012
Source: Match reports in Competitive matches

Disciplinary record

Overall
{| class="wikitable" style="text-align:center"
|-
!
!Total
!Home
!Away
|-
|align=left|Games played||58||29||29
|-
|align=left|Games won||46||24||22
|-
|align=left|Games drawn||7||3||4
|-
|align=left|Games lost||5||2||3
|-
|align=left|Biggest win||6–0 vs Zaragoza7–1 vs Osasuna||7–1 vs Osasuna||6–0 vs Zaragoza
|-
|align=left|Biggest loss||1–3 vs Barcelona||1–3 vs Barcelona||2–3 vs Barcelona0–1 vs Levante1–2 vs Bayern Munich
|-
|align=left|Biggest win (League)||6–0 vs Zaragoza7–1 vs Osasuna||7–1 vs Osasuna||6–0 vs Zaragoza
|-
|align=left|Biggest win (Cup)||5–1 vs Ponferradina||5–1 vs Ponferradina||2–0 vs Ponferradina
|-
|align=left|Biggest win (Europe)||4–0 vs Lyon6–2 vs Dinamo Zagreb||4–0 vs Lyon6–2 vs Dinamo Zagreb||3–0 vs Ajax3–0 vs APOEL
|-
|align=left|Biggest loss (League)||1–3 vs Barcelona||1–3 vs Barcelona||0–1 vs Levante
|-
|align=left|Biggest loss (Cup)||1–2 vs Barcelona||1–2 vs Barcelona||
|-
|align=left|Biggest loss (Europe)||1–2 vs Bayern Munich||||1–2 vs Bayern Munich
|-
|align=left|Clean sheets||22||7||15
|-
|align=left|Goals scored||174||105||69
|-
|align=left|Goals conceded||53||32||21
|-
|align=left|Goal difference||+121||+73||+48
|-
|-
|-
|align=left|Yellow cards||138||53||85
|-
|align=left|Red cards||10||1||9
|-
|align=left|Most appearances||align=left| Cristiano Ronaldo (55)||colspan=2|–
|-
|align=left|Most minutes played||align=left| Cristiano Ronaldo (5098)||colspan=2|–
|-
|align=left|Most goals||align=left| Cristiano Ronaldo (60)||colspan=2|–
|-
|align=left|Most assists||align=left| Mesut Özil (24)||colspan=2|–
|-
|align=left|Points||145/174 (%)||75/87 (%)||70/87 (%)
|-
|align=left|Winning rate||%||%||%
|-

References

Real Madrid CF seasons
Real Madrid
Real Madrid
Spanish football championship-winning seasons